Jordan North (born 14 February 1990) is an English radio DJ and television presenter, known for hosting shows on BBC Radio 1. In 2020, he became the runner-up of the twentieth series of I'm a Celebrity...Get Me Out of Here!.

Early life
North was born in York to Graham and Wendy North. He grew up in Burnley, Lancashire, living in Harle Syke and attending St James' Lanehead Primary School until the age of 11. Then moving to the Preston area, North continued his education at Penwortham Priory Academy and then Preston's College. He was born into a military family, his father Graham who served in the Queen's Lancashire Regiment from 1982 to 2006, and his brother Ryan who serves in 2 PARA are among nine close family members who have worked in the army.

North is an alumnus of the University of Sunderland where he graduated in 2011 with a First Class degree in B. A. Media Production. Working at Spark FM while at the university, during the last year of his degree, Jordan entered a Bauer Radio competition to find new talent, winning a Sunday show on The Hits Radio. He has also worked at the in-house radio station at Blackpool Pleasure Beach and community station Preston FM.

After leaving Spark and graduating from university, North worked as a researcher and producer at BBC Radio 5 Live. After recording a “pilot” show for Capital North East, he began presenting shows on Capital Manchester. He then spent 18 months working part-time at Rock FM before leaving the BBC when he was appointed as the Lancashire station's drive time presenter in May 2014.

After appearing as a freelance cover presenter in a number of BBC Radio 1 shows from 2014, he was one of a number of new voices picked to stand-in for Matt Edmondson during September 2017 and in early 2018 he was announced as the new host for the station's Greatest Hits show on Sunday mornings. From September 2020, he was announced as the new regular 11am-1pm weekend host on BBC Radio 1. North was also the main cover presenter for Scott Mills and Nick Grimshaw, occasionally known as Radio 1's "supply teacher".

Since March 2018, North has co-presented the comedy agony-aunt podcast Help I Sexted My Boss with friend and etiquette expert William Hanson. The show aims to offer advice to listeners who have encountered modern day problems. The podcast is currently in its ninth series and was nominated for 'Best Entertainment Podcast' at the British Podcast Awards 2020. On 5 February 2020, North appeared on children's singing competition Got What It Takes? as a guest mentor during the programmes annual Radio 1 interview challenge. In November 2020, it was announced that North would take part in the twentieth series of I'm a Celebrity...Get Me Out of Here!. He finished second on 4 December 2020 with Giovanna Fletcher crowned the Queen of the Castle.

Since 6 September 2021, North has presented the BBC Radio 1 drivetime show with Vick Hope, taking over from Nick Grimshaw.

In 2021, North replaced Fearne Cotton to co-present the Christmas and New Year editions of Top of the Pops alongside Clara Amfo .

In February 2022, North joined Ant & Dec's Saturday Night Takeaway, appearing during the "Happiest Minute Of The Week" segment surprising someone live with a "Gift on the Shift" in where they win a "Takeaway Getaway".

Personal life
North is a supporter of Burnley FC and was reported to be a season ticket holder in early 2018.

References

External links
Going Home with Vick and Jordan on Radio 1 (BBC Radio 1)

1990 births
Alumni of the University of Sunderland
BBC Radio 1 presenters
Alumni of the Student Radio Association
English radio personalities
People from Burnley
People from Preston (district)
Living people
Date of birth missing (living people)
People from York
I'm a Celebrity...Get Me Out of Here! (British TV series) participants
Top of the Pops presenters